Emotional baggage is an everyday expression that correlates with many varied but similar concepts within social sciences, self-help movements, and other fields: its general concern is with unresolved issues of an emotional nature, often with an implication that the emotional baggage is detrimental. 

As a metaphorical image, it is that of carrying all the disappointments, wrongs, and trauma of the past around with one in a heavy load.

Adult life
In adult life, emotional baggage comes to the fore in relationships in two main forms.  
First, there are the often negative expectations created by previous relationships, perhaps of an abusive nature—a kind of bondage to the past that can contaminate new and potentially more positive interactions. This may be particularly apparent in a second marriage where, in Virginia Satir's words, “shadows from the past are very real and must be dealt with by the new marital pair”. 
The second type of memories contributing to adult emotional baggage are recurrent bringing-up of the history of the current relationship, with the result that minor problems in the present become overwhelmed by negative currents from earlier times which cannot be resolved or set aside for good.

Childhood
Behind adult problems, however, there may be deeper forms of emotional baggage rooted in the experiences of childhood, but continuing to trouble personality and behaviour within the adult. 

Men and women may be unable to leave the pain of childhood behind, and look to their partners to fix this, rather than to address more adult concerns. 

Cultural and parental expectations, and patterns of behaviour drawn from the family of origin and still unconsciously carried around, will impact on a new marriage in ways neither partner may be aware of. 

Similarly, as parents, both sexes may find their own childhood pasts hampering their efforts at more constructive child-rearing, whether they repeat, or seek to overcompensate for, parental patterns of the past. 

Psychotherapy addresses such emotional baggage of the client under the rubric of transference, exploring how early development can create an internalised 'working mode'  through which all subsequent relationships are viewed; while the concept of  countertransference on the therapist's part acknowledges that they too can bring their own emotional baggage into the analytic relationship.

See also
 Backstory
 Personal equation
 Repetition compulsion
 Self-fulfilling prophecy

References

Further reading
 Patenaude AF Emotional Baggage: Unresolved Grief, Emotional Distress, Risk Perception, and Health Beliefs and Behaviors 2005
 Joseph LeDoux, 'Indelibility of Subcortical Emotional Memories', Journal of Cognitive Neuroscience (1989) vol 1 238-43

External links
 Losing Your Emotional Baggage

Emotion
Emotional issues
Popular psychology